Jeff Hughes may refer to:

 Jeff Hughes (musician), American traditional jazz cornet player
 Jeff Hughes (historian) (1965–2018), British historian of science
 Jeff Hughes (footballer) (born 1985), Northern Irish footballer
 Jeff Hughes (soccer) (born 1984), American soccer player
 Jeff Hughes (fighter) (born 1988), American mixed martial artist